Gora is a rural locality (a village) in Nyuksenskoye Rural Settlement, Nyuksensky District, Vologda Oblast, Russia. The population was 25 as of 2002.

Geography 
Gora is located 36 km northeast of Nyuksenitsa (the district's administrative centre) by road. Malaya Selmenga is the nearest rural locality.

References 

Rural localities in Nyuksensky District